Maurice Fields (born Maurice Sheil, 4 August 1926 – 18 December 1995) was an Australian vaudeville performer, actor and stand-up comedian.

Career
Fields became a well-known face on television first thanks to his comic sketches on live programs like Sunnyside Up and later dramatic roles as the conniving John Quinney in ABC TV's Bellbird. He also featured in many soap operas on commercial television, including Cop Shop, The Box, Prisoner (a small part playing crooked screw Leonard "Len" Murphy, and he had previously played two smaller parts in the show) and publican Vic Buckley in The Flying Doctors. He was also a regular as Fred Farrell in situation comedy series Bobby Dazzler (1977) and did regular comedy segments on Hey Hey It's Saturday.

He was also the editor of the jokes pages of the Australasian Post magazine for many years, a role continued by his son Marty after Maurie's passing. He appeared in retro-capture with his son Marty, in the Hey Hey reunions.

Selected filmography

Hunter (1967)
Country Town (1971) (TV film)
Cactus (1986) (film)
Evil Angels (film) 1988
Bellbird – John Quinney

Television 

Cop Shop
The Box
Prisoner
Hey Hey Its Saturday – as himself
The Flying Doctors – Vic Buckley
Neighbours – Sid

Personal life and Logie Honor
Fields was the son of an accountant and married twice. His first wife was Dorothy, and they had three children: Lorraine, Eileen and Alan. He then married the comedian and actress Val Jellay, who also portrayed his screen wife in The Flying Doctors. They played publicans Vic and Nancy Buckley. He was the father of comedian Marty Fields.

He died on 18 December 1995, from a heart attack, and became the first actor to be posthumously inducted into the Logie Hall of Fame. That honor was accepted at the awards ceremony in his name by his widow and long-time acting partner, Val Jellay.

Discography

Albums

Charting singles

References

External links

1926 births
1995 deaths
Australian male comedians
Australian male television actors
Logie Award winners
Vaudeville performers
20th-century Australian male actors
20th-century Australian comedians